Essai sur l'inégalité des races humaines  (Essay on the Inequality of the Human Races, 1853–1855) is a racist and pseudoscientific work of French writer Joseph Arthur, Comte de Gobineau, which argues that there are intellectual differences between human races, that civilizations decline and fall when the races are mixed and that the white race is superior. It is today considered to be one of the earliest examples of scientific racialism.

Expanding upon Boulainvilliers' use of ethnography to defend the Ancien Régime against the claims of the Third Estate, Gobineau aimed for an explanatory system universal in scope: namely, that race is the primary force determining world events. Using scientific disciplines as varied as linguistics and anthropology, Gobineau divides the human species into three major groupings, white, yellow and black, claiming to demonstrate that "history springs only from contact with the white races." Among the white races, he distinguishes the Aryan race, specifically the Nordic race and Germanic peoples, as the pinnacle of human development, comprising the basis of all European aristocracies. However, inevitable miscegenation led to the "downfall of civilizations".

Background 
Gobineau was a Legitimist who despaired at France's decline into republicanism and centralization. The book was written after the 1848 revolution when Gobineau began studying the works of physiologists Xavier Bichat and Johann Blumenbach.

The book was dedicated to King George V of Hanover (1851–66), the last king of Hanover.  In the dedication, Gobineau writes that he presents to His Majesty the fruits of his speculations and studies into the hidden causes of the "revolutions, bloody wars, and lawlessness" ("révolutions, guerres sanglantes, renversements de lois") of the age.

In a letter to Count Anton von Prokesch-Osten in 1856 he describes the book as based upon "a hatred for democracy and its weapon, the Revolution, which I satisfied by showing, in a variety of ways, where revolution and democracy come from and where they are going."

Gobineau and the Bible 
In Vol I, chapter 11, "Les différences ethniques sont permanentes" ("The ethnic differences are permanent"), Gobineau writes that "Adam is the originator of our white species" ("Adam soit l'auteur de notre espèce blanche"), and creatures not part of the white race are not part of that species.
By this Gobineau refers to his division of humans into three main races: white, black, and yellow. The biblical division into Hamites, Semites, and Japhetites is for Gobineau a division within the white race. In general, Gobineau considers the Bible to be a reliable source of actual history, and he was not a supporter of the idea of polygenesis.

Translation 
Josiah Clark Nott hired Henry Hotze to translate the work into English. Hotze's translation was published in 1856 as The Moral and Intellectual Diversity of Races, with an added essay from Hotze and appendix from Nott. However, it "omitted the laws of repulsion and attraction, which were at the heart of Gobineau's account of the role of race-mixing in the rise and fall of civilizations". Gobineau was not pleased with the version; Gobineau was "particularly concerned that Hotze had ignored his comments on 'American decay generally and upon slaveholding in particular'."

The German translation Versuch über die Ungleichheit der Menschenrassen first appeared in 1897 and was translated by Ludwig Schemann, a member of the Bayreuth Circle and "one of the most important racial theorists of imperial and Weimar Germany".

A new English-language version The Inequality of Human Races, translated by Adrian Collins, was published in Britain and the US in 1915 and remains the standard English-language version. It continues to be republished in the US.

Influence
Steven Kale argues that Gobineau's "influence on the development of racial theory has been exaggerated and his ideas have been routinely misconstrued".

Gobineau's ideas found an audience in the United States and in German-speaking areas more so than in France, becoming the inspiration for a host of racial theories, for example those of Houston Stewart Chamberlain. "Gobineau was the first to theorize that race was the deciding factor in history and the precursors of Nazism repeated some of his ideas, but his principle arguments were either ignored, deformed, or taken out of context in German racial thought".

German historian Joachim C. Fest, who wrote a biography of Hitler, describes Gobineau, in particular his negative views on race-mixing as expressed in his essay, as an eminent influence on Adolf Hitler and Nazism. Fest writes that the influence of Gobineau on Hitler can be easily seen and that Gobineau's ideas were used by Hitler in simplified form for demagogic purposes: "Significantly, Hitler simplified Gobineau's elaborate doctrine until it became demagogically usable and offered a set of plausible explanations for all the discontents, anxieties, and crises of the contemporary scene." However, Professor Steven Kale has cautioned that "Gobineau's influence on German racism has been repeatedly overstated".

Although cited by groups such as the Nazi Party, the text implicitly criticizes antisemitism and describes Jews in positive terms, the Jews being seen as a superbly forged race of "ancient Greek-like strength" of cohesion. Implicitly, the folk of Judah merely represented a wandering, semi-austral variation of Ur-Aryan blood-stock. Gobineau stated, "Jews... became a people that succeeded in everything it undertook, a free, strong, and intelligent people, and one which, before it lost, sword in hand, the name of an independent nation, had given as many learned men to the world as it had merchants." Philo-Judaic sentiment was intermixed with ethnological theories concerning the primally Indo-Iranian/Indo-Aryan archeogenetic matrix whence sprang the Jews. In these lines of speculative anthropology, the Jews were anciently (supposedly) primordially interpreted as of atypical Indo-European ethnicity: Judaic racial typology emerged from Iranid–Nordid founders, the details considered inessential, possessors of compatibly "white" "Aryan" blood being the main point. The latter-day "Hamiticized" Jewish folk came into existence from non-Afro-Asiatic Hurrian (or Horite), Jebusite, Amorite or early-Hittite, Mittani-affiliated racial nuclei, the "consensus science" of the time asserted. The blatantly, ironically almost aggressive pro-Jewish attitude of Gobineau, akin to Nietzsche in sheer admiration and lionization of the Jews as one of the "highest races", proved ideologically vertiginous to the Nazi propagandists and Procrustean thinkers—here Gobineau unmistakably contradicted perhaps the main pillar of Nazi political ideology, which has been described as the schizoid, neo-Gnostic dualism of "Jewish demonology". Incompatible with Nazi ideology, the Count's fervent Judaic positivity and total dearth of antisemitism the Nazis could only attempt to ignore or minimize away in the silence of hypocrisy.

The book continued to influence the white supremacist movement in the United States in the early 21st century.

See also
IQ and Global Inequality
Scientific racism

References

Bibliography 
 Gobineau, Arthur (Count Joseph Arthur de Gobineau) The Inequality of Human Races translated by Adrian Collins
 Gobineau, Arthur (Count Joseph Arthur de Gobineau) The Moral and Intellectual Diversity of Races, with particular reference to their perspective influence in the civil and political history of mankind translated by Henry Hotze
 Gobineau, Arthur (Count Joseph Arthur de Gobineau) Versuch Uber Die Ungleichheit Der Menschenracen translated by Ludwig Schemann

External links 
 Essai sur l'Inegalite de Races Humaine in French at Google Books Vol. 1, Vol. 2, Vol. 4
 Versuch über die Ungleichheit der Menschenracen trans. by Ludwig Schemann at Google Books Vol. 1, Vol. 2, Vol. 3, Vol. 4
 The Moral and Intellectual Diversity of Races: With Particular Reference to Their Respective trans. by H. Hotz, with an Appendix by J. C. Nott

1855 books
1855 essays
Ethnography
Race and intelligence controversy
Scientific racism
Sociology books
White supremacy
Works about the theory of history